Livingston railway station was a railway station which served the village of Livingston and the community of Livingston Station, both of which were later amalgamated into the new town of Livingston in West Lothian, Scotland. It was located on the Edinburgh and Bathgate Railway. The area close to the station now known as Deans and the old Livingston is now called Livingston Village.

History 
The original Livingston station was opened by the Edinburgh and Bathgate Railway on 12 November 1849. Between December 1875 and July 1925 its name was spelt "Livingstone". British Railways closed the station on 1 November 1948. This station was situated 32 chains west of the present  station.
The station had a single siding on the down line which served its goods yard. 19 chains west of the station, a tramway serving a limeworks crossed under the main railway, and formed an interchange with a set of sidings to transfer the traffic to rail. Also at this location was the West Lothian oil works.

Services

References

Notes

Sources 
 
 
 

Disused railway stations in West Lothian
Former North British Railway stations
Railway stations in Great Britain opened in 1849
Railway stations in Great Britain closed in 1948
1849 establishments in Scotland